The IBM 3592 is a series of tape drives and corresponding magnetic tape data storage media formats developed by IBM.  The first drive, having the IBM product number 3592, was introduced under the nickname Jaguar.  The next drive was the TS1120, also having the nickname Jaguar. , the latest and current drive is the TS1160 Gen 6.  The 3592 line of tape drives and media is not compatible with the IBM 3590 series of drives, which it superseded.  This series can store up to 20 TB of data (uncompressed) on a cartridge and has a native data transfer rate of up to 400 MB/s.

Like the 3590 and 3480 before it, this tape format has half inch tape spooled onto 4-by-5-by-1 inch data cartridges containing a single reel.  A take-up reel is embedded inside the tape drive.  Because of their speed, reliability, durability and low media cost, the 3592 tape drives are still in high demand.  A hallmark of the genre is interchangeability.  Tapes recorded with one tape drive are generally readable on another drive, even if the tape drives were built by different manufacturers.

Since TS1120 all drives include built-in encryption processing, with platform software (for example, z/OS Security Server) managing encryption keys. Prior drives require server-based software to encrypt and decrypt tapes.

Drives 

 Notes
 IBM Redbook with information on 3592 models (See sections 2.5 and 2.6)

Cartridges 
Unlike many other tape standards, the 3592 format allows an extensive re-use of cartridges already owned. Older generation tapes can be reformatted to higher capacities with every new drive generation, according to the table below. Cartridges are expected to operate in read and write mode across at least three drive generations. The observed media replacement rate in large archives is therefore lower than with most other standards.

Reformatting a cartridge means increasing its track density (only), as the linear bit density is limited by the tape coating. In the table below, a 'JA' type cartridge can be reformatted from 300 GB initially to 640 GB in the TS1130 drive. A later 'JB' type cartridge will carry 1 TB since its better coating also permits a higher linear bit density. Generally speaking, linear density is limited by material, semiconductor and signal processing technologies, whereas track density is limited by the servo technology that prevents track runout.

 Notes
 The TS1150 drive CAN NOT read or write to any Gen 1 or Gen 2 cartridges.
 The TS1140 drive CAN read but not write to Gen 1 cartridges of any format, and Gen 2 cartridges in TS1120 format.  It can however, read and write to Gen 2 cartridges in TS1130 format.
 3592 media datasheet
 IBM 3592 Cartridges and Compatibility

References

External links 
 IBM Tape storage
 Fifty years of storage innovation
 Read/Write Compatibility Matrix
 PC Magazine's Magstar Reference

3592
Computer storage tape media